Zyablikovo may refer to:

 Zyablikovo (Moscow Metro), a station of the Moscow Metro, Russia
 Zyablikovo District, Southern Administrative Okrug of Moscow, Russia